Pixo was a company that developed infrastructure for hand-held devices. It was founded in 1994 when Paul Mercer, a software developer at Apple, left to form his own company. The company developed a system software toolkit in C++ for use on cell phones and other hand-held devices.  They were acquired by Sun Microsystems in 2003.

Pixo OS and use in Apple's iPod
In 2001, Pixo was rehired by Apple to adapt their system software for use in the iPod. The use of the Pixo OS in the iPod was never formally announced, although the first-generation iPod's "About iPod" display includes a mention of Pixo, and a Connectix biography of their VP of engineering Mike Neil mentions his role as "lead architect on the Pixo OS that is used in ... the Apple iPod". Apple acquired the Pixo OS shortly after shipping the iPod and removed mention of Pixo from the "About iPod" display with a firmware update to the first-generation iPod.

On April 9, 2007, Apple CEO Steve Jobs announced the shipment of its 100 millionth iPod, making the Pixo OS one of the most widely used embedded operating systems.

With the 2014 discontinuation of the iPod Classic
and the 2017 discontinuation of the iPod Nano, which did not run
iOS, Apple no longer sells a Pixo-based iPod.

References

External links

Bill Mogridge video interview of Paul Mercers involvement in the design of the iPod

IPod software
Sun Microsystems acquisitions
Software companies based in the San Francisco Bay Area
Software companies established in 1994
Software companies disestablished in 2003
1994 establishments in California
2003 disestablishments in California
Defunct companies based in the San Francisco Bay Area
Defunct software companies of the United States
2003 mergers and acquisitions